is a Japanese electone player. In the mid-1970s he recorded a four-LP album set titled Special Sound Series for Nippon Columbia. Sekitō also performs and teaches as a pianist under the stage name .

Biography 
Sekitō's parents were both primary-school teachers and he has two sisters, both of whom are pianists. Sekitō graduated from Osaka Kyoiku University's Special Music Course Composition Department. Often called as a Superstar or Genius of Electone, Shigeo Sekito is widely recognized as a specially gifted and outstanding energetic Electone player in the Electone community. He learned piano in his early childhood, began to compose songs at the age of 17, and majored in composition at Osaka Education College. Later, he was charmed with the new instrument called Electone, which was Yamaha's newly debut electronic transistor organs. A while later, he made his debut at the 1967 Electone Grand Prix.

Since his debut, this composer and also as a musician has remarkably applied his abundant talents to Electone. His fresh, energetic, rhythmic and sometimes humorous style of playing is attracting a growing number of fans and enthusiasts to try and play Electone, and expected to develop new possibilities in Electone world. He is actively engaged in numerous concerts and recordings, both at home and abroad, practicing up to 14 to 15 hours a day. Sekito's music is what mostly described as "careful as the devil and daring as the angel itself". His selection of tone color, certainly of setting tones and miraculously manipulation of tones and bound to make us find ourselves all of a sudden pulled back to our past inner experiences or thrown away into the opened future cosmic space. This is indeed, a demonic work and may also as a result from the sweetness and purity of the angelic whisperings. According to the New Straits Times, Sekitō had released ten albums by 1991 and averaged two concerts per month, using the rest of his time to teach piano to students.

In 1991, Sekitō performed arrangements of works by Mozart and Beethoven on his EL 90 Electone at the World Trade Centre Kuala Lumpur. Sekitō began the concert by playing his own arrangement of the Concierto de Aranjuez by Joaquin Rodrigo. Later, he changed his career into a pianist and changed his name into Akisino Ken (秋篠 健 / アキシノ・ケン).

Discography

Studio albums

 エレクトーン・ファンタスティック！! EX-21のすべて (196X)
 Special Sound Series Vol. 1 (1975)
 Special Sound Series Vol. 2 (1975)
 Special Sound Series Vol. 3 (1976)
 Special Sound Series Vol. 4 (1977)
 エレクトーンの魅力 - 青い影 / 天使のささやき (1979)
 アーティスティック・エレクトーン Artistic Electone (1985)

Compilations 

 華麗なるポピュラー・エレクトーン (1986)
 Holiday in Electone by E-3 (Unknown)

References

External links
 Special Sound Series Vol. 1 (1975)
 Special Sound Series Vol. 2 (1975)
 Special Sound Series Vol. 3 (1976)
 Special Sound Series Vol. 4 (1977)
 Shigeo Sekito Unofficial Website

Japanese electronic musicians
20th-century Japanese musicians
Living people
Year of birth missing (living people)